To Say the Least is an American game show that aired on NBC from October 3, 1977 to April 21, 1978. The show was produced by Heatter-Quigley Productions, hosted by Tom Kennedy and announced by Kenny Williams. This was Kennedy's third NBC show to debut in the span of one year; his first, 50 Grand Slam, was canceled after a 13-week run in December 1976 and was replaced by a daytime version of Name That Tune, which was canceled in June 1977 after 26 weeks. It initially fared well in the Nielsen ratings against CBS' The Young and the Restless and ABC's The Better Sex, but when The $20,000 Pyramid took over the noon slot on ABC in early 1978, the ratings began to suffer, and To Say the Least was cancelled in April of that year, with reruns of Sanford and Son taking its former time slot.

Format
Two teams, one consisting of men and the other women, competed. Each team consisted of one civilian player and two celebrities.

The object of To Say the Least was to guess the identity of subjects in as few words as possible. For each subject, one team member played while the other two were placed in isolation.

Both onstage players were shown a clue of six to ten words and the subject to which it referred. The players alternated choosing one word at a time to eliminate from the clue. At any time, either player could challenge the other team's offstage players to guess the subject, at which time they were brought back onstage and shown the clue. If the clue was reduced to a single word, the teammates of the player who eliminated the next-to-last word were forced to guess.

A correct answer won the game, while a miss awarded the win to the opposing team. The first team to win two games won the match, with $100 and a prize package awarded to the civilian player.

All-Star Game
The winning contestant advanced with all four celebrities to play the All-Star Game for a chance at a cash jackpot.

Each of the celebrities stood behind one of four numbered doors on stage, assigned in random order, and the contestant was given the subject and a clue. The contestant eliminated all but three words in the clue, after which it was shown to the first celebrity so he/she could guess. A correct response won $100 for the contestant. One more word was then eliminated, and the second celebrity then took a guess that awarded an additional $200 to the contestant if correct.

Regardless of the outcome of these two guesses, the contestant removed one more word and the remaining two celebrities were given a chance to guess, one at a time. If either of them guessed correctly, the contestant won a cash jackpot that started at $2,000 and increased by $1,000 for every game it went unclaimed.

Contestants remained on the show until they either lost two matches or played seven All-Star Games, whichever came first. Any contestant who won four consecutive matches received a new car.

Episode status
One episode is held at The Paley Center for Media.

References

External link
To Say the Least on IMDb

1977 American television series debuts
1978 American television series endings
1970s American game shows
NBC original programming
English-language television shows
Television series by MGM Television
Television series by Heatter-Quigley Productions